This article documents the history of Rochester, New York, in western New York State.  Settlement began in the late 18th century, and the city flourished with the opening of the Erie Canal.  It became a major manufacturing center, and attracted many Italians, Germans, Irish and other immigrants, as well as a dominant group of Yankees of New England origin. The Yankees made Rochester the center of multiple reform movements, such as abolitionism and women's rights.  It was famous as the center of the American photography industry, with headquarters of Eastman Kodak. In the 1970s it became fashionable to call the industrial cities along the Great Lakes 'rustbelt cities' following the move away from steel, chemical and other hard goods manufacturing. Rochester, with the presence of Ritter-Pfaulder, Bausch and Lomb, Eastman Kodak, Xerox, Gannett and other major industries, defied the trend for many decades following WWII.

Of the 19 places in the United States named Rochester, at least 8 were named directly after Rochester, New York, having been founded or settled by former residents.  These include: Rochester, Indiana; Rochester, Texas; Rochester, Iowa; Rochester, Kentucky; Rochester, Michigan; Rochester, Minnesota; Rochester, Nevada; and Rochester, Ohio.

Early settlement
Following the American Revolution, western New York was opened up for development as soon as New York and Massachusetts compromised and settled their competing claims for the area in December 1786 by the Treaty of Hartford. The compromise was that, while New York would have political sovereignty over the land, Massachusetts would have pre-emptive rights to obtain title from the Native Americans and own (and profit from selling) the land.

Phelps and Gorham purchase 

On April 1, 1788, after extensive machinations by various speculators, Massachusetts' pre-emptive right over all western New York Lands — comprising some 6,000,000 acres (24,000 km2) — was sold to Oliver Phelps and Nathaniel Gorham, both of Massachusetts. The sales price was $1,000,000, payable in three equal annual installments of certain Massachusetts securities then worth about 20 cents on the dollar. The right sold applied to all land west of a line running from the mouth of Sodus Bay on Lake Ontario, due south through Seneca Lake, to the 82nd milestone on the Pennsylvania border near Big Flats (the "Pre-emption Line"), and all the way to the Niagara River and Lake Erie (the "Phelps and Gorham Purchase"). In order to obtain title to such land, Phelps and Gorham would have to extinguish all Native American titles.

When the land didn't sell as well as they had hoped, Phelps and Gorham were unable to come up with the funds to extinguish the Native American titles. They defaulted on their second payment in 1790. They lost the right to buy the pre-emptive rights to remaining lands of the Phelps and Gorham Purchase west of the Genesee River. This land, about 3,750,000 acres (15,000 km2), reverted to Massachusetts. The state immediately re-sold the pre-emptive rights to Robert Morris in 1791 for $333,333.33 (about $ today). In 1792 and 1793, Morris sold most of the lands west of the Genesee to the Holland Land Company, but he did not extinguish Native American title to the land until the Treaty of Big Tree in September, 1797. At the north end of the Reserve, Morris sold an 87,000 acre (350 km2) triangular shaped tract ("The Triangle Tract") to Herman Leroy, William Bayard and John McEvers, and he also sold a 100,000 tract due west of the Triangle Tract to the state of Connecticut. Additional Phelps and Gorham lands east of the Genesee River which had not previously been sold, were acquired by Robert Morris in 1791, who re-sold them to The Pulteney Association, a syndicate of British investors.

Mill Yard Tract 

Before defaulting on the rest of the land purchase agreement, Phelps and Gorham gave a 100-acre (0.4 km2) lot within the Mill Yard Tract at the Upper Falls of the Genesee to Ebenezer "Indian" Allen, on condition he build a grist mill and sawmill there by summer 1789 (the "100 Acre Tract"). In exchange for the  Tract, Allen built the agreed-upon mills at the west end of the Upper Falls of the Genesee. But the location was so deep in the wilderness that there were only 14 men in the area to assist in the mill's construction. The area was a dense forest and swamp, and infested with rattlesnakes and mosquitoes that spread 'Swamp Fever' or what we now call malaria.

In March 1792, with no settlers and no demand for mills, Indian Allen sold the  Tract to Benjamin Barton, Sr. of New Jersey for $1,250. Barton almost immediately resold the property to Samuel Ogden, an agent for Robert Morris. Ogden, in turn, sold the property in 1794 to Charles Williamson, agent for The Pulteney Association. On November 8, 1803, The Pulteney Association sold the  Tract for $1,750, on a five-year land contract, to Col. Nathaniel Rochester (1752–1831), Maj. Charles Carroll, and Col. William Fitzhugh, all of Hagerstown, Maryland.

Rochesterville and The Flour City

Rochester was dominated by ethnocultural  politics. Two rival  groups fought for power, the Presbyterian Yankees from New England, and the Episcopalian New Yorkers from New York and Pennsylvania. When Irish Catholics started to arrive in large numbers in the 1840s and supported the Democrats, the two Protestant groups stopped feuding and presented a common front.
Col. Rochester and his two partners allowed the millsite to lie undeveloped until 1811, when they finally completed paying for their purchase and received the deed. The population of the area was 15. They then had the tract surveyed and laid out with streets and lots. The first lot was sold to a Henry Skinner, at what is now the northwest corner of State and Main. In 1817, other land owners, mainly the Brown Brothers (of Brown's Race and Brown's Square), joined their lands north to the  Tract, to form the Village of Rochesterville, with a population of 700.

In 1821, Monroe County was formed out of parts of Ontario and Genesee counties, and Rochesterville was named the county seat. A two-story brick courthouse in the Greek Revival style was built at a cost of $7,600. In 1823, property of Elisha Johnson on the east side of the Genesee across from the  Tract was annexed, bringing Rochesterville to 1,012 acres (4.1 km2) and the population to about 2,500. That year, "-ville" was dropped from the city's name. This was also the year that the first 800-foot (244 m) Erie Canal Aqueduct was finished over the Genesee, just south of the Main Street Bridge. It was built over 16 months by 30 convicts from Auburn State Prison. In 1822, the Rochester Female Charitable Society was founded. Members paid twenty-five cents per year to belong to the Society and also contributed provisions, clothing, and bedding which they collected from the community. Visitors distributed the goods and money to the poor of each district. By 1872, seventy-three districts had been established, each with a woman visitor. That organization was instrumental in founding the Rochester Orphan Asylum (now Hillside Children's Center), the Rochester City Hospital (now Rochester General Hospital), the first school, the workhouse, the Home for the Friendless (now The Friendly Home), the Industrial School, and The Visiting Nurse Service.

Soon after the Erie Canal east to the Hudson River was opened in 1825, the economy and population grew quickly. By 1830, the population reached 9,200, and the city became the original boomtown first known as "The Young Lion of the West." It quickly, however, became known as the Flour City, based on the numerous flour mills which were located along waterfalls on the Genesee in what is now the Brown's Race area of downtown Rochester. The first ten days the canal was open east to the Hudson, 40,000 barrels (3,600 tons) of Rochester flour were shipped to Albany and New York City. Local millers soon were grinding 25,000 bushels of wheat daily. In 1829, the Rochester Athenaeum was founded as a reading society. The Athenaeum charged members a five-dollar annual fee to hear lectures by some of America's best-known orators including Oliver Wendell Holmes, Sr., Horace Greeley and Ralph Waldo Emerson. The Athenaeum was one of the forerunners of the Rochester Institute of Technology.

By 1834, some 20 flour mills were producing 500,000 barrels (44,000 t) annually, the population reached 13,500 and the city area expanded to 4,000 acres (16 km2). Rochester was then re-chartered as a city, and Jonathan Child, son-in-law of Col. Rochester, was elected its first mayor.

In 1837, the Rochester Orphan Asylum was founded by the Rochester Female Charitable Society.  The Asylum was located on South Sophia Street (now South Plymouth Avenue) and later moved to Hubbell Park. After a tragic fire on January 8, 1901, the Asylum was moved to Pinnacle Hill, reconstructed as a series of cottages called the Hillside Home (now Hillside Children's Center, part of Hillside Family of Agencies). The Charitable Society also founded Rochester City Hospital on Buffalo Street (now West Main Street), where the old Buffalo Street Cemetery was located. Construction on the hospital began in 1845 but it was not occupied until 1863. By 1838 Rochester was the largest flour-producing city in the world.

The Flower City

In 1830, William A. Reynolds started his first seed business at the corner of Sophia and Buffalo Streets (now South Plymouth Avenue and West Main Street). This was the start of what would become the Ellwanger & Barry Nursery Co., which eventually was relocated to Mt. Hope Avenue, across from Mount Hope Cemetery. James Vick and Joseph Harris also start their own nursery businesses. The population in 1830 was only 9,207, but it still ranked as the 25th largest city in the United States. In 1840, the population and rank were 20,191 and 19th, respectively. In 1842, the original aqueduct over the Genesee River was replaced with a better one slightly south of the first one. This latter aqueduct now supports Broad Street.

By 1850, the population reached 36,000, making it the 21st largest city in the United States. Westward expansion had moved the focus of farming to the Great Plains and Rochester's importance as the center for flour milling had declined. Several seed companies in Rochester had grown to become the largest in the world, with Ellwanger & Barry Nursery Co. the largest. Rochester's nickname was changed from the Flour City to the Flower City. In 1850, the University of Rochester was founded in the U. S. Hotel on Buffalo St, and affiliated with the Baptist Church. Two four-year courses were offered. In 1851, due to Rochester and Monroe County's tremendous growth, a new three-story county courthouse in the Greek Revival style was constructed. It was built from brick manufactured at Cobb's Hill by Gideon Cobb, and cost $76,000.

Rochester abolitionism
Rochester takes pride today in its role as the last Underground Railroad stop for fugitive slaves before taking a boat for Canada, across Lake Ontario. It was the home for many years of abolitionist Frederick Douglass, a formerly enslaved African American, who in 1847 commenced publishing an abolitionist newspaper, The North Star, in Rochester. The paper's name refers to fugitive slaves' destination: north.

The Underground Railroad
In the years leading up to the Civil War, numerous locations in the Rochester area were used as safe houses to shelter fugitive slaves before they were placed on board boats (often on the Genesee River) for transport to Canada. The route was part of the famous Underground Railroad. Other "stations" were located in the areas surrounding Rochester, including Brighton, Pittsford, Mendon, and Webster. A station in North Chili, just west of Rochester, run by abolitionist Methodists was an important site in the formation of the Free Methodist Church, which was formed in 1860. The denomination's first college, Roberts Wesleyan College, was built on the site.

One contemporary described the Frederick Douglass homes as "a labyrinth of secret panels and closets, where he secreted the poor human wretches from the man hunters and the blood-hounds, who were usually not far behind."

Anti-abolitionism
He stated that: "I know of no place in the Union where I could have located at the time with less resistance, or received a larger measure of sympathy and cooperation." However, on his arrival, he found "barriers erected against colored people in most places of instruction and amusement in the city, and until I went there they were imposed without any apparent sense of injustice and wrong." His daughter could not take classes with white girls. "The city felt no love for the negro, and although there were few of the race in Rochester, they were carefully segregated."

Douglass delivered his fiery speech "The Meaning of July Fourth to the Negro" at a meeting organized by the Rochester Ladies Antislavery Association at Corinthian Hall, Rochester, on July 5, 1852.
In 1857, Susan B. Anthony and William Lloyd Garrison spoke at an abolition meeting. In October, 1858, William H. Seward, a leading opponent of slavery, delivered a speech to an overflowing Republican crowd in Corinthian Hall. He argued that the political and economic systems of North and South were incompatible, famously saying that the "irrepressible conflict" between the two systems would eventually result in the nation becoming "either entirely a slave-holding nation, or entirely a free-labor nation."

Women's rights movement
Rochester was involved with women's rights from an early date.  The Rochester Women's Rights Convention, which met on August 2, 1848, was the second such convention in the nation.  (The first was the Seneca Falls Convention, which met two weeks earlier in Seneca Falls, a town not far away.)  The Rochester convention elected a woman as its presiding officer, a highly controversial step at the time that was opposed even by some of the meeting's leading participants. This convention was the first public meeting composed of both men and women in the U.S. to take that step.

Susan B. Anthony, a national leader of the women's suffrage movement, was from Rochester.  In a case that generated a national controversy, she was arrested for voting in Rochester in 1872, well before it was legal for women to vote.  Her trial,  United States v. Susan B. Anthony, was held in a federal circuit court presided over by a Supreme Court justice.  When the judge directed the jury to deliver a guilty verdict and ordered Anthony to pay a fine of $100, Anthony responded, "I shall never pay a dollar of your unjust penalty", and she never did. As a young woman, she was widely ridiculed for her views on women's rights, but she was increasingly respected as the nation began to take her ideas seriously.  She celebrated her eightieth birthday at the White House at the invitation of President William McKinley.  The Nineteenth Amendment to the United States Constitution, which guaranteed the right of women to vote in 1920, was popularly known as the Susan B. Anthony Amendment because of her decades of work toward its passage, which she did not live to see. Anthony's  home is now a National Historic Landmark known as the National Susan B. Anthony Museum and House.

Post-war industrial boom

The period 1860 to 1900 saw Rochester grow from a city of 48,000 to a city of 162,800, with a 1900 rank of 24th largest in population, down from 18th in 1860. During this period the city expanded dramatically in area on both sides of the Genesee River, as well as annexing parts of the towns of Brighton, Gates, Greece and Irondequoit. Also founded during this period were Bausch & Lomb by John Jacob Bausch and Henry Lomb, Eastman Kodak by George Eastman, Western Union Telegraph by Hiram Sibley and Don Alonzo Watson, Gleason Works by William Gleason, and R.T. French Company by Robert French. Other important industries that developed during this period were clothing manufacturing, shoe manufacturing, brewing and machine tools. In 1875, Rochester's first city hall opened at Fitzhugh and the Erie Canal (now Broad Street). It was built at a cost of over $335,000 on the site of the First Presbyterian Church, which had burned to the ground in 1869. The church sold the lot to the city for $25,000. This city hall housed city government until 1978.

In 1882, the tolls on the Erie Canal ended, with New York State enjoying a profit of $51,000,000 over the 57 years. In September 1885, a group of Rochester businessmen founded the Mechanics Institute to establish "free evening schools in the city for instruction in drawing and such other branches of studies as are most important for industrial pursuits of great advantage to our people." Henry Lomb of Bausch & Lomb was the Mechanics Institute's first president.

During this period many of Rochester's great public parks were laid out, with Ellwanger & Barry and others donating land in 1871 for Maplewood Park and in 1889 for Highland Park. In 1895, George Eastman and James P. B. Duffy donated an additional 120 acres (0.5 km2) for Highland Park. On Independence Day, 1894, community leaders, responding to the continued tremendous growth in Rochester and Monroe County, laid the cornerstone for the third County Courthouse (now the County Office Building). Two years and $881,000 later, the four-story granite and marble courthouse in the Italian Renaissance style was complete. In 1897, the first master's degrees were awarded by the University of Rochester and in 1900, due largely to the efforts of Susan B. Anthony, women were admitted.

In 1891, the Mechanics Institute merged with the Rochester Athenaeum to form the Rochester Athenaeum and Mechanics Institute (RAMI). Comprehensive instruction in mechanical subjects was RAMI's hallmark. The institute's builders responded to both industrial and societal trends in Rochester, and each year the Institute graduated increasing numbers of expertly trained professionals who found work in industry both in Rochester and elsewhere.

By the middle of the 1890s no less than five freight and passenger railroads were servicing the city and each had a separate station. This provided Rochester with ample transportation but services continued to expand with the arrival of inter-urban electric railroads such as the Rochester, Lockport and Buffalo Railroad and the Rochester, Syracuse and Eastern Rapid Railroad which began to service Rochester during the early 20th century. The Lehigh Valley Railroad's station and the former Buffalo, Rochester and Pittsburgh Railway terminal are the only surviving stations built by these railroads.

In addition, Rochester was home of the Cunningham automobile, a pioneering vehicle produced by carriage maker James Cunningham, Son and Company. Like many early companies, production was small, only about 400 units a year, including hearses, all designed by Volney Lacey.

The 20th century
 
The turn of the century found Rochester a thriving and comfortable city. Although the nursery business was waning, some of that land had been converted into desirable residential districts along East Avenue, Park Avenue, and off Mount Hope Avenue near Highland Park. In 1901, a devastating fire killed 31 at the Rochester Orphan Asylum, and it moved across town from Hubbell Park to Pinnacle.

Because of the highly skilled labor force Rochester enjoyed, the city became a significant industrial contributor to the World War II effort, while the farms and fields surrounding Rochester provided food for the troops as well as the home front. To recognize specialized professional nature of its programs, in 1944, the Rochester Athenaeum and Mechanics Institute changed its name to The Rochester Institute of Technology.

In 1904, R. T. French sent prepared mustard to the St. Louis World's Fair, where it was paired with another innovation — the hot dog — and became a hit.

In the early 1900s, both George Eastman and Andrew Carnegie gave substantial sums to the University of Rochester. Eastman also donated the funds to establish the Eastman Dental Dispensary. In 1908, Francis Baker donated 120 acres (0.5 km2) for Genesee Valley Park, and Durand-Eastman Park opens, a gift of Henry Durand and George Eastman.

In 1913, the Memorial Art Gallery on the University of Rochester's Prince Street Campus was founded. It was the gift of Emily Sibley Watson as a memorial to her son, architect James Averell. In 1918, the Erie Canal through Rochester was closed and abandoned after the Barge Canal opened, transiting Rochester through Genesee Valley Park. The Court Street Dam was also built in 1918 to raise the level of the river to that of the Barge Canal so no aqueduct or locks are necessary, but in so doing the Upper Falls and the Castelton Rapids were obliterated.

By 1920, Rochester's population had reached 290,720, and it ranked 23rd largest in the United States. That year, the city purchased the abandoned Erie Canal lands inside city limits for use as a heavy rail mass transit and freight system. In 1921, the first Lilac Week occurred, celebrating Rochester's floral legacy in Highland Park. In 1922, Rochester's first radio station began broadcasting, and the Eastman Theatre opened, an adjunct to the Eastman School of Music of the University of Rochester. In 1925, George Eastman arranged a land swap with Oak Hill Country Club. The Oak Hill property, just west of Mt. Hope Cemetery on the east side of the Genesee River was given to the University of Rochester for its River Campus, and the country club moved to its present site in Pittsford. In 1925, the university opened its Medical School and Strong Memorial Hospital on Crittenden Road, and by 1927, general construction had begun on the River Campus. It was also in 1925 that the university awarded its first Ph.D., and by 1930, several departments were training candidates for the doctorate. In 1928, Red Wing Stadium opened. That year, the Rochester Democrat and Chronicle, the morning newspaper, was purchased by Frank Gannett.

By 1930, the population had swelled to 328,132, making Rochester the 22nd largest city in the United States. The University of Rochester opened its River Campus for men, and the Prince Street Campus became the Women's Campus. The Rochester Municipal Airport opened on Scottsville Road. It was in the 1930s that Eastman Kodak introduced Kodachrome® film. By now the subway was constructed in the old canal bed, and the street railways were diverted to the subway or morphed into buses. From 1927 until 1956, Rochester was the smallest city in America with a subway. Rochester celebrated its centennial as a city in 1934. In 1936, the Rundel Memorial Building opened as the headquarters of the Rochester Public Library above the bed of the old Erie Canal, adjacent to South Avenue, between Broad Street and Court Street.

By 1940, the population had decreased to 324,975, the first drop since Rochester was founded. It was still the 23rd largest city in the United States. With the advent of World War II, some 29,000 Rochester-area men were drafted into military service.

During the war, Cobbs Hill Park was used as a Prisoner of War camp.  The first POWs arrived September 28, 1943. Sixty Italian prisoners worked on area farms and food processing plants 10 hours a day, six days a week, at $0.80 per day. After Italy capitulated to the Allies October 12, 1943, and joined the war against Germany the Italian POW's became unguarded internees.  The Italians were replaced at Cobbs Hill with German POWS June 26, 1944. The city was hit in February 1945 with seven successive snowstorms that paralyzed the city, forcing the city to ask that POWs be brought from the Hamlin Camp to the city. Cobbs Hill Park housed 100 Germans, while 175 more were at Edgerton Park. Snow removal by prisoners was done at unannounced locations, with city police guarding the POWs.

Following the war, the "Rochester Plan" called for the development of quality, low rent housing for veterans returning from World War II and their families.  Three garden apartment complexes were built as part of the Rochester Plan: Fernwood Park, Norton Village, and Ramona Park.

1945-1999

By 1950, the population of the city had grown slightly to 332,488, but Rochester was now only the 32nd largest city in the United States. During the 1950s, Xerox Corporation (originally Haloid Corporation) expanded as it exploited Chester Carlson's xerography patents. Xerox went on to become the world leader in xerographic imaging, designing and manufacturing many of its famous products in the Rochester area. Eastman Kodak continued to dominate the film and camera industry and was Rochester's leading industrial employer, but other Rochester companies also employed many technical and manufacturing personnel, including Gleason Works, Stromberg-Carlson, Taylor Instrument, Ritter Dental Equipment, Rochester Products Division of General Motors, and Pfaudler-Permutit. In 1955, the Colleges for Men and Women of the University of Rochester were merged. In 1958, three new schools were created in engineering, business administration, and education.  Smugtown USA by G. Curtis Gerling (Plaza Publishers 1957, reprinted 1993) is a scathing critique of the city's 1940s and 1950s culture.

By the 1960s, as with the rest of the United States, the population was shifting from city to suburb, with substantial growth in the towns immediately adjacent to the city, including Greece, Gates, Chili, Henrietta, Brighton and Irondequoit.

The 1960 census showed a population drop to 318,611 and a drop in rank to 38th. The Rochester 1964 race riot took place in July of that year and marked the beginning of riots throughout the United States during the civil rights period.  The disturbance broke out in Rochester's predominantly African-American districts on 24 July 1964. Peace was restored after 3 days, but only after the National Guard was called out. Although the riot was blamed on "outside agitators", all the rioters arrested were from the Rochester area. This led to a reappraisal of old-time policies and practices which had not changed in face of a tripling of the African-American population in 10 years, who were still mostly assigned to low-pay and low-skill jobs and lived in sub-standard housing. Because of the riots the city soon saw its first African American Public safety director, several African American police officers were hired. City leaders convinced local radio stations to seek African American announcers. WHAM hired Vic Mason and later Lou Paris, but the real change in black relations came when FM WCMF brought in Herb Hamlett who aired a morning R&B show six days a week. Hamlett became the voice of Rochester's black community, and was the most powerful voice in the city.

It was also in the 1960s that the city began a process of urban renewal, with the construction of Midtown Plaza, the first indoor shopping mall in a traditional downtown area in the United States.  In the middle of that decade, when the New York State Department of Public Works decided it would build the Inner Loop expressway through the downtown Rochester Institute of Technology campus, the decision was made to build a new campus in the suburbs. The move to a more spacious location was critical to RIT's 1966 selection as the site for the National Technical Institute for the Deaf, and the 1,300 acre (5.3 km2) campus in suburban Henrietta opened in 1968. Decisions on urban renewal in Rochester had both positive and negative effects. As part of urban renewal several theaters were demolished for new buildings as was the famous New York Central Bragdon Station in 1966.

In the 60s and 70s, Rochester became known as the leading jazz town in upstate New York. Famous jazz musicians would come to Clarissa Street and play all night long moving from club to club. The Pythodd Room had been around for some time but reached its zenith in the late 1960s and 1970s under the ownership of Delores Thomas and her son Stanley Thomas Jr.  The Pythodd was one example of a top Clarissa Street "joint" that hosted jam session including everyone from Little Stevie Wonder to Jimmy Smith and the Mangione brothers (Chuck and Gap).  The Mangiones grew up in Rochester, and Chuck went on to become one of the biggest "cross-over" trumpeters in jazz history, with his records regularly being played on jazz, smooth jazz, and easy listening stations.

As part of continuing urban renewal, in 1969 Xerox Corporation opened a thirty-story office tower (Xerox Tower) at Broad Street East and Clinton Avenue South, although Xerox also moved its corporate headquarters to Stamford, Connecticut at about the same time. Lincoln Rochester Trust Company (now Chase Bank) opened a 28-story office tower, the Chase Tower at Clinton Avenue South and East Main Street. Later in the '70s, new offices and hotels were constructed along State Street, just north of Main Street. Most of Front Street and part of Corinthian Street were obliterated in the process. At Main Street and the Genesee River, a new hotel was opened, as was one at South Avenue and Main Street in a process that involved the almost complete reconstruction of the main street bridge by removing buildings that lined both sides of it. In 1978, city hall moved to the old Federal Building at State and Church.

In the 1990s, a new baseball stadium, Frontier Field, was built for the Rochester Red Wings near the Kodak office building. Bausch and Lomb constructed a new world headquarters just south of Main Street straddling Stone Street and a new Central Library expanding the capacity of the Rochester Public Library complex was erected across from the Rundel Library Building on South Avenue.

The new millennium 

The population of the City of Rochester at the 2000 census was 219,773, down 33.9% from its peak in 1950. In 2003 Rochester built a ferry terminal to house the Spirit of Ontario I. Product of the William A. Johnson, Jr. administration, the "Fast Ferry" was short lived and after troubles with the start-up and operations, newly elected Mayor of Rochester Robert Duffy announced that the city government would be cutting off funds for the ferry. The City sold the Spirit of Ontario I at a financial loss in 2007 to the German company Förde Reederei Seetouristik Gmbh & Co (FRS) for $29.8 million (US).

In 2006, a new stadium funded by private and public sources, PAETEC Park, was opened, not far from Frontier Field, and became the home of the Rhinos professional soccer team. Its naming sponsor has changed and it was later known as Capelli Sport Stadium, and then as Marina Auto Stadium.

The same year, the Census Bureau estimated that Rochester's population had declined further to 206,000. This would prove in the end to be the city's low point, as growth resumed in the second half of the decade. By the 2010 official census, Rochester had built back up to 210,565. More recent estimates indicate a population growth for the city of about 0.25% per year (or a little over 500 persons annually), which could bring the total over 215,000 by the 2020 census if the rate of growth continues.

In 2007, PAETEC Holding Corp. announced that they would be building a new tower downtown in place of Midtown Plaza. The PAETEC Tower was said to be built slightly higher than the Xerox Tower. Since then, however, the company was sold, plans for the tower were scaled down, and a much more modest headquarters building for PaeTec's successor firm, Windstream, was completed in 2013.

Mayor Duffy was both criticized and praised for his efforts to take "mayoral control" of the failing city school district, in a manner similar to school governance re-organizations in New York and Chicago. The issue effectively stalled at the end of 2010 when Duffy was elected New York State Lieutenant Governor, as part of Governor Andrew Cuomo's administration. His successor, Thomas Richards, was elected in a 2011 special election and announced that the issue had been "placed on the back burner".

In 2013, Lovely Warren was elected Rochester's first female mayor. Under Warren, a project to fill in the Inner loop and convert it to a boulevard was undertaken and a plan to build a performing arts center on a parcel of the former Midtown Plaza is underway.

Civil unrest 
 Riot at Corinthian Hall
 Canal Strike of 1855
 Put down by the Union Gray militia
 The Howard Riot (1872)
 Put down by the army
 The Gorham Street Riot (June 1887)
 The Street Car Strike of 1889
 Rochester 1964 race riot
 Put down by the National Guard
 1967 Unrest
 2020 unrest caused by the killing of Daniel Prude

Footnotes

Further reading 
 Fisher, Donald. "The Civil War Draft in Rochester: Part I and II." Rochester History (Winter/Spring, 1991 ), vol 53, nos. 1–2. 
 Frank, Meryl, and Blake McKelvey. "Some Former Rochesterians of National Distinction." Rochester History July 1959: 21
 Glaeser, E. L., S. P. Kerr, and W. R. Kerr. "Entrepreneurship and Urban Growth: An Empirical Assessment with Historical Mines (SSRN Scholarly Paper No. ID 2247635). Rochester, NY: Social Science Research Network." (2013). 
 Johnson, Paul E. A Shopkeeper's Millennium: Society and Revivals in Rochester, New York, 1815-1837 (1978)
 Keene, Michael. Folklore and Legends of Rochester:: The Mystery of Hoodoo Corner and Other Tales (2011) excerpt and text search
 McKelvey, Blake. Rochester: A Brief History (Edwin Mellen Press, 1984)
 McKelvey, Blake. A panoramic history of Rochester and Monroe County, New York (1979) online
 McKelvey, Blake.   Rochester on the Genesee: the growth of a city (1993) excerpt and text search; 292pp A brief history
 McKelvey, Blake. Rochester (4 vol, Syracuse University Press, 1961–73), the standard scholarly history.
 McKelvey, Blake. Rochester: The Water Power City, 1812-1854 (1945) online
 McKelvey, Blake. Rochester: The Flower City, 1855-1890 (1949)
 Mckelvey, Blake. Rochester: The quest for quality 1890-1925 (1956). online 
 Mckelvey, Blake.  Rochester: An Emerging Metropolis 1925-1961 (1961). online
 McKelvey, Blake. "The Germans of Rochester: Their Traditions and Contributions." Rochester History (1958) 20#1 pp: 7–8. Online
 McKelvey, Blake. "The Irish in Rochester An Historical Retrospect." Rochester History 19: 1–16. online
 McKelvey, Blake. "Rochester's Mid Years: Center of Genesee County Life: 1854-1884." Rochester History. no. 3 (July, 1940).
 McKelvey, Blake. "The Theater in Rochester During Its First Nine Decades." Theater  (1954) 16#3 online
 McKelvey, Blake. "The Men's Clothing Industry in Rochester's History." Rochester History (July 1960) (1960): 26–27. online
 McKelvey, Blake. "The Italians of Rochester An Historical Review." Rochester History 22 (1960): 1-24. online
 McKelvey, Blake. "Rochester's Part in the Civil War." Rochester History (January, 1961). online
 McKelvey, Blake.  "A History of the Police of Rochester, New York." Rochester History (1963) 25#4 pp 1–27.  Online
 Perkins, Dexter. "Rochester One Hundred Years Ago." Rochester History Vol. I, No. 3. July, 1939. 
 Rosenberg-Naparsteck, Ruth. "Two Centuries of Industry and Trade in Rochester." Rochester History (1989) 51: 1-20. online
 Salamone, F. Italians in Rochester, New York, 1900-1940 (Edwin Mellen Press, 2000). 
 Schantz, Brian. "The Presidential Election of 1840 in Rochester, New York." (2012). Online

External links
 Rochester Population 1812-1990. University of Rochester
 History of Jazz in Rochester from Noal Cohen's Jazz History Website
 Shilling Donovan A. Rochester's Romantic Rogue: The Life and Times of Ebenezer Allan 
Rochester Publications 1834-1860 by Robert G. Koch
Rochester's Do-It-Yourself Solution to a Budget Crunch by Gerard E. Muhl
Millers and Milling in Rochester, New York by Robert G. Koch
1894: A Vintage Year for Rochester? by Robert G. Koch
Myron Holley's Days in Rochester by Donovan A. Shilling
Tobacco: Rochester Connections by Robert G. Koch
Cows and Milk in Rochester by Robert G. Koch
How Rochester Lamps Helped Light Up the World by Donovan A. Shilling
Horse Cars and Trolleys by Robert G. Koch
The Glory Days at the Driving Park by Donovan A. Shilling
George B. Selden's Road Engine by Robert G. Koch
Early Automobiles in Rochester by Robert Koch
Interurban Electric Trolley Cars by Robert G. Koch
The Great Iron Ore Odyssey by Donovan A. Shilling
Rochester's Urban Development Projects by Donovan A. Shilling
Horace McGuire and Black Artillery by Robert G. Koch
Henry A. Ward by Robert G. Koch
Margaret Woodbury Strong and her Museum of Fascination by Donovan A. Shilling
The Extraordinary Kate Gleason: How She Put the World in Gear by Donovan A. Shilling

External links
 "Pictures of Rochester and Monroe County, NY"
 Rochester History
 Rochester Images
 Walking Tour of Downtown Rochester
 The Rochester Wiki
 The Riot of July 1964
 Ontario's Historical Plaques
 The Strong museum

 
Erie Canal